Christiaan Jacobus 'Jacques' Momberg (born 18 February 1991) is a South African rugby union player, currently playing as a hooker for Italian Top12 side Rovigo., with which he won the National Championship in 2016 and the Italian Cup in 2020.

He was a member of the Pumas side that won the Vodacom Cup for the first time in 2015, beating  24–7 in the final. Momberg made six appearances during the season and also played in the final.

References

South African rugby union players
Living people
1991 births
Pumas (Currie Cup) players
Blue Bulls players
Rugby union hookers
Rugby union players from Pretoria
Afrikaner people
Rugby Rovigo Delta players